William Honychurch (by 1489 – 1530/1531), of Tavistock, Devon and London, was an English politician.

Family
Honychurch was the son of Walter Honychurch of Tavistock and Marion née Fitz of Tavistock. He was educated at Lincoln's Inn. He married Emma Coles, daughter of John Coles of North Tawton, Devon. They had three sons and two daughters.

Career
He was a Member (MP) of the Parliament of England for Tavistock in 1529.

References

15th-century births
1531 deaths
Members of the Parliament of England for Tavistock
Lawyers from Devon
English MPs 1529–1536
Members of Lincoln's Inn
15th-century English lawyers
16th-century English lawyers